Motorola Single Board Computers is Motorola's production line of computer boards for embedded systems. There are three different lines : mvme68k, mvmeppc and mvme88k. The first version of the board appeared in 1988. Motorola still makes those boards and the last one is MVME3100.

NetBSD supports the MVME147, MVME162, MVME167, MVME172 and MVME177 boards from the mvme68k family, as well as the MVME160x line of mvmeppc boards.

OpenBSD supports the MVME141, MVME165, MVME188 and MVME197 boards.

References

Motorola products
PowerPC mainboards
68k architecture